Softball was contested by five East Asian countries at the 2006 Asian Games at Doha, Qatar from December 10 to December 14, 2006.  All games were played at the Al-Rayyan Baseball and Softball Venue.

Schedule

Medalists

Squads

Results
All times are Arabia Standard Time (UTC+03:00)

Preliminary

Final round

Semifinals

Final

Grand final

Final standing

References
Results
Official website

 
2006
2006 Asian Games events
2006 in softball